The Kabu Formation is a Late Cretaceous geologic formation of Middle Cenomanian age and is part of the Mifune Group. Dinosaur remains are among the fossils that have been recovered from the formation, although none have yet been referred to a specific genus. The formation was named by N. & K. Wasada in 1979.

Vertebrate paleofauna

References 

Geologic formations of Japan
Late Cretaceous